{{Infobox person
| name               = Autumn Reeser
| image              = Autumn Reeser by David Shankbone.jpg
| caption            = Reeser at the 2007 Tribeca Film Festival
| birth_date         = 
| birth_place        = 
| birth_name         = 
| alma_mater         = 
| known_for          = {{Unbulleted list|No Ordinary Family|A Country Wedding|A Bramble House Christmas|Entourage|The O.C.|Hawaii Five-0}}
| occupation         = Actress
| years_active       = 2000–present
| spouse             = 
| children           = 2
| homepage           = 
}}

Autumn Reeser (born September 21, 1980) is an American actress. She is known for her roles as Taylor Townsend on the Fox series The O.C., Lizzie Grant on HBO's Entourage, Katie Andrews on ABC's No Ordinary Family, and Leslie Bellcamp on E!'s The Arrangement. She has appeared in the films The Girl Next Door (2004), So Undercover (2012), Sully (2016), and in ten Hallmark Channel television films in leading roles.

Early life
During her childhood, Reeser played a wide variety of characters in local musical theater productions, from the age of seven until seventeen. Reeser graduated from Carlsbad High School in 1998. After high school, she moved to Los Angeles. She graduated from UCLA's School of Theater, Film and Television in 2004. She also studied acting at the Beverly Hills Playhouse.

Career

Television
Early in her career, she appeared in television commercials for Burger King, Clean & Clear and International House of Pancakes. Her first on-screen appearance was a role as Ventu Girl in the episode "Natural Law" of UPN's Star Trek: Voyager. Shortly thereafter, she booked guest roles in television shows CSI: Crime Scene Investigation, Birds of Prey and Cold Case, and moved onto recurring roles in the sitcoms Grounded for Life, Maybe It's Me and Complete Savages. She rose to fame through her role as Taylor Townsend on the Fox series The O.C. (2005–2007). She reflected back on the character during a 2010 interview, saying "I feel like there's a lot of girls out there who could really relate to her, who hadn't seen themselves on TV in that way. I loved that about her. I loved that she made no apologies for who she was even though she wasn't what all the magazines said was OK. She was like, "I'm still valid. And I'm awesome. And I know I'm odd, and that's OK."

Reeser portrayed Lizzy Grant in ten episodes of HBO's comedy-drama television series Entourage (2009–2010). First appearing in the show's sixth season, Lizzie is a junior agent working in the Miller Gold Agency's TV division under Andrew Klein, with whom she has an affair. Reeser played Phoebe Valentine, a goddess from Greek mythology in The CW's romantic comedy-drama series Valentine (2008–2009). In 2009, she portrayed lawyer Ashley Hastings in three episodes of TNT's legal drama series Raising the Bar. Reeser played Katie Andrews, Julie Benz's personal assistant in ABC's No Ordinary Family (2010–2011). The show centers on the Powells, a typical American family living in fictional Pacific Bay, California, whose members gain special powers after their plane crashes in the Amazon, Brazil. Reeser also had roles as Kylie Sinclair in Last Resort, as Dr. Gabrielle Asano in Hawaii Five-0 and as Abigail Bruce in Necessary Roughness. She had guest roles in several television shows, including It's Always Sunny In Philadelphia, Ghost Whisperer, Pushing Daisies, Human Target, Royal Pains, Jane by Design, and Hart of Dixie.In 2015, Reeser portrayed Amanda Weil in three episodes of ABC's science fiction drama series The Whispers. In 2017, she had a recurring role as Tess, Darius Tanz's childhood sweetheart, on the CBS show Salvation. She played talent agent Leslie Bellcamp on the two seasons of The Arrangement, on the E! network. The series follows an unknown actress who, after a successful audition, is plucked from obscurity and offered a secret contract to be the fiancée to Kyle West, one of Hollywood's biggest stars. In 2018, she made a guest appearance as Dr. Wells on Fox's procedural drama television series 9-1-1, in the episode "Let Go".

Films
Reeser has appeared in several feature films and television movies, such as the musical The American Mall with Nina Dobrev, the comedy The Girl Next Door with Elisha Cuthbert, the horror film Lost Boys: The Tribe with Corey Feldman, the thriller The Big Bang with Antonio Banderas, the action movie Smokin' Aces 2: Assassins' Ball with Tom Berenger and the detective comedy So Undercover with Miley Cyrus. She appeared in Clint Eastwood's biographical drama film Sully (2016), released on September 2, 2016. The film received positive reviews from critics and grossed over $240 million worldwide. She also appeared in films  Kill 'Em All (2017), Valley of Bones (2017), Dead Trigger (2017), and The Legend of La Llorona (2022).
 
In late 2012, she received positive reviews for Hallmark Channel's Love at the Thanksgiving Day Parade, in which she was the main heroine. Shortly after, she appeared in a number of romantic comedies aired on the Hallmark Channel, with leading roles in Midnight Masquerade (October 2014), I Do, I Do, I Do (February 2015), A Country Wedding (June 2015), Valentine Ever After (February 2016), A Bramble House Christmas (November 2017), Season for Love (August 2018), Love on the Menu (February 2019), All Summer Long (August 2019), and Christmas Under the Stars (November 2019).

Theater
Since 2006, she has been a member of The WorkJuice Players, a theater troupe primarily known for The Thrilling Adventure Hour, a popular Los Angeles staged production in the style of old-time radio. She stars in the Amelia Earhart segment, playing the famed pilot, traveling through time; as well as playing a wide variety of other characters in other segments. In 2015, Reeser and The Thrilling Adventure Hour were invited to perform in New York City and Chicago, then Australia (Sydney) and New Zealand (Auckland and Wellington). Other members in the troupe include Paul F. Tompkins, Paget Brewster and Busy Philipps.
 
An accomplished singer and dancer, Reeser has played in many musicals throughout her life. She also sang in numerous cabarets around Los Angeles, including Upright Cabaret and the acclaimed For The Record: Quentin Tarantino (Show at Barre). Reeser played Julie Cooper in The O.C. one-night musical, which took place at The Federal Bar in North Hollywood on August 30, 2015. In 2019, she starred in the West Coast premiere of Nicky Silver's Too Much Sun at the Odyssey Theater in Los Angeles.

Video games
Reeser played the character of Lissette Hanley in the video game Command & Conquer: Red Alert 3, released in 2008.

 Other ventures 
Reeser was featured on the cover of December 2006 issue of Stuff magazine. She has also appeared in editorials for Maxim, Celebrity Skin and Zooey. She was ranked at number 57 on the Maxim magazine's "Hot 100 of 2006" list, at number 65 on the Maxim "Hot 100 of 2007" list and at number 85 on the Maxim "Hot 100 of 2011" list.

Personal life
On May 9, 2009, Reeser married writer and director Jesse Warren in Ojai, California. The couple have two children. In November 2014, Reeser filed for divorce from Warren and requested joint physical and legal custody of their children. 
  
Author and friend Patrick Loubatière wrote her 2014 biography, titled No Ordinary Girl, published in English and French.
 
In 2015, she was elected to SAG-AFTRA's National and Los Angeles Local Boards.

 Filmography 

 References 

 Bibliography 

Patrick Loubatière. Autumn Reeser - No Ordinary Girl'' (Book, 2014).

External links

 
 
 
 

21st-century American actresses
Actresses from San Diego
American film actresses
American musical theatre actresses
American stage actresses
American television actresses
American video game actresses
American bloggers
Living people
UCLA Film School alumni
American women bloggers
1980 births